This is a list of members of the Victorian Legislative Council between 1937 and 1940. As half of the Legislative Council's terms expired at each triennial election, half of these members were elected at the 1934 triennial election with terms expiring in 1940, while the other half were elected at the 1937 triennial election with terms expiring in 1943.

 On 17 March 1938, Robert Williams, Independent (formerly Labor) MLC for Melbourne West Province, died. Labor candidate Pat Kennelly won the resulting by-election in May 1938.
 In July 1938, Sir George Wales, UAP MLC for Melbourne Province, resigned over an alleged conflict of interest. Labor candidate Paul Jones won the resulting by-election in September 1938.

Sources
 Re-member (a database of all Victorian MPs since 1851). Parliament of Victoria.

Members of the Parliament of Victoria by term
20th-century Australian politicians